"Finally See Our Way" is a song by Australian electronic band Art vs. Science. It was released in November 2010 as the lead single from their debut album The Experiment (2011)

The song was used by Network Ten to promote Smallville on Eleven in Australia in 2011

The song peaked at number 98 on the ARIA Charts.

At the APRA Music Awards of 2012, the song was nominated for Dance Work of the Year.

Charts

References 

2010 singles
2010 songs